Ziemeļgauja is a protected landscape area  Ziemeļvidzeme with a total area of 21,749 ha, which was established in 2004 in a section of about 140 km along the Gauja middle stream and its valley.  The territory of the park includes natural, unregulated river (Gauja) and its ancestral system, botanically valuable meadows, old mixed and deciduous forests. The park is part of a network of protected areas Natura 2000.

Flora and fauna 
There is a great diversity of rare Latvian and EU-wide specially protected habitats in the protected area, which is home to many very rare species of lichens, vascular plants, invertebrates and birds. So far, 126 specially protected species in Latvia have been identified in the protected landscape area "Ziemeļgauja": three fungi,
nine species of lichens, four mosses, 13 vascular plants, 47 invertebrates, one reptile, one amphibian, four species of roundnose grenadier and fish, 35 species of birds and nine mammals, and 26 habitats of the EU Habitats Directive have been identified

Tourist infrastructure 

References 

Natura 2000 in Latvia
Nature parks in Latvia
 Valka Municipality
 Smiltene Municipality
 Valmiera Municipality
Vidzeme